Bhuvanagiri Municipality is a municipality in the  Y.Bhuvanagiri District of the Telangana state of India. The municipality comprises 35 wards.

BHUVANAGIRI MUNICIPALITY IS 4th Oldest municipality(1930 year) in Telangana after Hyderabad(1869), Warangal(1899), Khammam(1910).

In 2000 Elections TDP formed the municipality and  Penta Narsimha (28/03/2000 to 28/03/2005) served as chairmen for the house. He elected through the direct election by the people. In 2007 Elections Congress formed the municipality and Donakonda Vanitha (2007–2009), Barre Jhangir (2009–2011) served as chairmen for the house. In 2014 Elections Bjp Won - 8 Seats, Tdp- 7 Seats, Congress - 7 Seats, Independents - 6 Seats, CPM - 1 Seat.
In 2019 Elections TRS formed the municipality(Currently)

References

External links
BHONGIR Municipality website

Nalgonda district